Nada Topčagić (born 3 July 1953) is a Bosnian folk singer.

Life and career

Early life
Nada Topčagić was born on July 3, 1953 in Modriča, FPR Yugoslavia and was raised in the nearby village of Tarevci. While attending primary school, she also temporarily reside in Osijek. At the age of eighteen, Topčagić was discovered by the prominent producer and instrumentalist, Žika Radenković, who brought her to Belgrade so she can pursue a recording career.

Career
She debuted in 1975 with the single "Na Drini ćuprija", written by Obren Pjevović. Topčagić gained most success during the 80s with hits which include "Treba mi tvoje rame" (1982), "Zovem te, zovem" (1984), "Izvini, dušo izvini" (1985) and "Jutro je" (1989), which is arguably the greatest hit of hers. She has competed on eminent Yugoslavian music festivals such as Hit Parada, MESAM and Vogošća festival. Over the years Topčagić has released twenty studio albums and has maintained a career spanning over five decades.

During the Croatian War of Independence in the early 90s, Topčagić faced public scrutiny after she had performed alongside other singers for Serb soldiers in Vukovar a month after the city's fall. In 2022, she stated that they were forced to do so, explaining that she would not have done it, if she were to chose now.

In March 2021, she received saw widespread publicity when Swedish footballer Zlatan Ibrahimović used a snippet of "Jutro je", at the Sanremo Music Festival.

She has been known for her often eccentric appearance, and has compered herself to Lady Gaga.

Personal life
Topčagić is married to former manager Zlatko Đurđević, with whom she has a son, named Miroslav (b. 1984). She also has two grandchildren.

Discography 
Studio albums

 Život je lep dok si mlad (1979)
 Stare dobre pesem (1980)
 Ja sam tvoja i ničija više (1981)
 Treba mi tvoje rame (1982)
 Pomozi mi (1983)
 Zovem te, zovem (1984)
 Želim te, želim (1985)
 Nežno, nežnije (1987)
 Na srcu mi ležiš (1988)
 Volela sam (1989)
 Koju igru igraš (1990)
 Sudba siroana (1992)
 Ljubomorna sam (1994)
 Nada Topčagić (1996)
 Nada Topčagić (1997)
 Nada Topčagić (1998)
 Nada Topčagić (2001)
 Nada Topčagić (2004)
 Nada Topčagić (2005)
 Nada Topčagić (2020)

EPs and singles
 Na Drini Ćuprija (1975)
 Postoji samo jedan čovek / Dva zlatna prstena (1976)
 Zaklanjaš mi Sunce (1977)

Filmography

References

External links
 
 

1955 births
People from Modriča
Living people
Yugoslav musicians
Serbian folk singers
Grand Production artists
Bosnia and Herzegovina emigrants to Serbia
Serbian people of Bosnia and Herzegovina descent